USS Cardinal (MHC-60) was the tenth Osprey-class coastal mine hunter in the United States Navy. She was commissioned on 18 October 1997, decommissioned on 7 January 2007 and sold to Egypt.

References

 

Ships built in Georgia (U.S. state)
1996 ships
Osprey-class coastal minehunters
Ships transferred from the United States Navy to the Egyptian Navy